The 2000 DieHard 500 was a NASCAR Winston Cup Series race held on April 16, 2000 at Talladega Superspeedway in Talladega, Alabama. Contested over 188 laps on the 2.66 mile (4.28 km) superspeedway, it was the 9th race of the 2000 NASCAR Winston Cup Series season. Jeff Gordon of Hendrick Motorsports won the race, his milestone 50th win.

Background
Talladega Superspeedway, formerly known as Alabama International Motor Speedway, is a motorsports complex located north of Talladega, Alabama. It is located on the former Anniston Air Force Base in the small city of Lincoln. A tri-oval, the track was constructed in 1969 by the International Speedway Corporation, a business controlled by the France family. Talladega is most known for its steep banking. Talladega is the longest NASCAR oval with a length of 2.66-mile-long (4.28 km) tri-oval like the Daytona International Speedway, which is a 2.5-mile-long (4.0 km).

Top 10 results

Race statistics
 Time of race: 3:06:11
 Average Speed: 
 Pole Speed: 
 Cautions: 4 for 17 laps
 Margin of Victory: 0.189 sec
 Lead changes: 27
 Percent of race run under caution: 9%         
 Average green flag run: 34.2 laps

References

DieHard 500
DieHard 500
NASCAR races at Talladega Superspeedway